Octreotate or octreotide acid is a somatostatin analogue that is closely related to octreotide. Its amino acid sequence is

H-D-Phe-Cys-Phe-D-Trp-Lys-Thr-Cys-Thr-OH

while octreotide has the terminal threonine reduced to the corresponding amino alcohol.

See also 
 DOTA-octreotate

References 
 

Cyclic peptides
Somatostatin receptor agonists
Sulfur heterocycles